Mindi Dickstein is an American lyricist and librettist.

Dickstein wrote the lyrics for the 2005 musical production Little Women, based on the 1868 novel of the same name by Louisa May Alcott. Other notable work includes the book for Toy Story: The Musical. She is now writing lyrics for Benny & Joon, a new musical based on the MGM film of that name with music by Nolan Gasser and libretto by Kirsten Guenther, scheduled to commence the 2017–2018 season at The Old Globe in San Diego, California.

Since 1996, Dickstein has taught at New York University's Tisch School of the Arts in the graduate musical theatre programme. In 2001, Dickstein received the Jonathan Larson Grant.

A graduate of Brookline High School in Massachusetts, Dickstein received her Master of Fine Arts in Musical Theater Writing from New York University in 1993. She was an Oscar Hammerstein Fellow there.

References

American musical theatre librettists
American musical theatre lyricists
Tisch School of the Arts alumni
New York University faculty
Living people
Brookline High School alumni
Year of birth missing (living people)